Sanders' Knoxville Raid (June 14–24, 1863) saw 1,500 Union cavalry and mounted infantry led by Colonel William P. Sanders raid East Tennessee before the Knoxville campaign during the American Civil War. The successful raid began at Mount Vernon, Kentucky and moved south, passing near Kingston, Tennessee. Moving east from the Kingston area, the raiders struck the East Tennessee and Georgia Railroad at Lenoir Station. The Union horsemen rode northeast along the railroad, destroying track, bridges, and property useful to the Confederate States of America. Blocked from seizing Knoxville by its 1,000 Confederate defenders, Sanders' horsemen destroyed a major bridge across the Holston River at Strawberry Plains on the East Tennessee and Virginia Railroad. After wrecking a smaller bridge at Mossy Creek, the raiders turned northwest, evading pursuers by slipping through an obscure gap in the Cumberland Plateau. Sanders' men reached Boston, Kentucky on June 24, having captured and paroled over 400 Confederate soldiers while sustaining minimal losses in men but considerable losses in horses.

Background
Since the start of the Civil War, President Abraham Lincoln and other government authorities urged Union generals to invade East Tennessee. There were two reasons for this. First, a large part of the East Tennessee population remained loyal to the government in Washington, D.C. and seethed under Confederate occupation. Second, a key railroad through the region connected Virginia with the western Confederate states. The East Tennessee and Georgia Railroad linked Knoxville with Chattanooga, Tennessee and Dalton, Georgia, while the East Tennessee and Virginia Railroad connected Knoxville with Bristol, Virginia. Logistics was the major obstacle keeping Union forces from seizing East Tennessee. There were no railroads linking the region with Union-occupied areas of Kentucky, and the wagon roads across the Cumberland Plateau became very difficult to use in bad weather. Supplying an invading army with necessities by wagon promised to be challenging. Lincoln hoped to build a railroad, but its construction was not attempted because it would have taken too long. Therefore, Union commanders directed their efforts to capturing Middle Tennessee in 1862.

On April 27, 1863, the Union XXIII Corps was formed from the regiments stationed in Kentucky and put under the command of Major General George Lucas Hartsuff. The Army of the Ohio, led by Major General Ambrose Burnside consisted of the XXIII Corps plus the IX Corps from the Eastern Theater. Burnside was tasked with the invasion of East Tennessee at the same time that the Army of the Cumberland was ordered to capture Chattanooga. On June 2, Burnside left his Cincinnati headquarters in order to lead the expedition. However, the following day he was ordered to send 8,000 troops to assist in the Siege of Vicksburg. Burnside sent the veteran IX Corps under Major General John Parke and this caused the planned invasion to be delayed until August 16.

While waiting for the return of IX Corps, Burnside ordered a cavalry raid to destroy important railroad bridges east and west of Knoxville. This operation was recommended in May 1863 by IX Corps Brigadier General Orlando B. Willcox, who also advised appointing Sanders as its commander. In December 1862, a successful cavalry raid led by Brigadier General Samuel P. Carter inflicted damage on the railroad. Sanders was born in Kentucky, raised in Mississippi, graduated from West Point Academy in 1856, and served on the western frontier. Despite his Southern upbringing, Sanders remained loyal to the Union, fighting at the battles of Williamsburg and Antietam before being appointed colonel of the 5th Kentucky Cavalry Regiment on March 4, 1863.

Raid

On June 14, 1863, Sanders left Mount Vernon, Kentucky with 1,500 Union mounted soldiers from the following units. 

At Williamsburg, Sanders sent the wagon train back with an escort of 200 horsemen. Meanwhile, another column of Federals rode south of Williamsburg toward Big Creek Gap as a diversion. Sanders' column passed west of Huntsville, Tennessee, and arrived near Montgomery on the evening of June 17. Discovering that some Confederate cavalry were nearby at Wartburg, Sanders sent 400 men from the 1st Tennessee to attack them. Sanders' men surprised, captured, and paroled 2 officers and 102 men, and seized their horses. The Union raiders also captured and destroyed six wagons filled with food, artillery ammunition, and tools. As they approached Kingston, the Union horsemen discovered that Colonel John S. Scott's Confederate cavalry brigade was in the town, so Sanders crossed the Clinch River  to the northeast to avoid it. 

This bridge was found to be guarded by a force too strong to be overwhelmed, so Sanders headed for Lenoir's Station instead. On June 19 at 8 am, the Union cavalry descended on Lenoir's, capturing 65 Confederates and three iron 6-pounder field guns. Sanders' raiders cut the telegraph line, burned the depot, seized 75 horses and mules, and destroyed 2,500 weapons, 5 pieces of artillery, ammunition, and military equipment. Believing Baker was a Confederate soldier, they chased him into his house, fatally wounding him, but not before he wounded one of the Union cavalrymen. 

Buckner left 1,000 Confederates to defend Knoxville and these were joined by 200 armed citizens and soldiers not fit for active duty. Colonel Robert C. Trigg commanded the 6th Florida, 7th Florida, and 54th Virginia Infantry Regiments. Trigg placed six 6-pounder field guns on McGee's, Summit, and Temperance Hills outside the city and supported them with his infantry units. At 7 pm on June 19, Sanders left the 1st Kentucky to watch the west side of Knoxville while he circled around the city with the rest of his raiders to approach it from the north. He tore up the railroad so that reinforcements could not be sent to the bridges above the city. Early on June 20, the Union raiders skirmished with Knoxville's defenders for about one hour. Sanders withdrew after losing 1 killed and 2 wounded and inflicting a loss of 4 killed and 4 wounded on the defenders. The raiders also captured two 6-pounders, 31 men, and 80 horses.

Sanders' raiders crossed the Holston River and attacked the Confederate bridge guard at Strawberry Plains, which numbered 400 men. Sanders sent Moore and the 44th Ohio to make a dismounted attack, while other troops under Byrd and Dow attempted to cut off the bridge guard's retreat. After one hour, most of the Confederates fled aboard a locomotive and train, while 2 officers and 137 men surrendered. Sanders' men wrecked 5 cannons, 70 tents, a large quantity of salt and food, and other supplies. The Union cavalrymen spent the night destroying the bridge, which was supported by 11 piers. Starting at dawn on June 21, the raiders moved east to Mossy Creek near Jefferson City. After capturing its 120-man bridge guard, Sanders' men destroyed the Mossy Creek bridge and ruined more supplies, including 200 barrels of sugar. They also wrecked nearby saltpeter and gun factories. Aware that his column was the target of Confederate forces, Sanders left the railroad and made a dash for Rogers' Gap in Cumberland Mountain. 

Sanders' column forded the Holston River at Hayworth's Bend and headed for Powder Springs Gap in Clinch Mountain. The Union raiders soon found a Confederate force in front with a second pursuing force coming up behind. The column used country roads to evade the force in front and passed through the gap without resistance. When approaching Rogers' Gap (near Speedwell), the Union column discovered the road obstructed with felled trees and defended by infantry and artillery. Unable to use the road, Sanders destroyed his two artillery pieces plus three captured guns, ammunition, artillery wagons, and harness. Sanders' escape was facilitated by some East Tennessee soldiers in his command who knew all the byways. The skirmishes in the area occurred on June 22. Sanders described Smith's Gap as a mere bridal path and noted that part of his force became separated near there. Dow and the missing 170 men eventually escaped and rejoined the column in Kentucky. Sanders' main column arrived at Boston, Kentucky, on June 24.

Results

The Union raiders sustained casualties of 2 killed, 4 wounded, and 13 missing. Sanders reported that his soldiers captured several hundred horses during the raid. So many horses broke down and were left behind that not every raider had a horse at the end of the operation. Sanders reported paroling 461 Confederate prisoners. Burnside congratulated Sanders for the "brilliant success of your expedition". The destroyed spans were the  Strawberry Plains bridge, the  Slate Creek bridge, and the  Mossy Creek bridge. Buckner reported that the repair crews would have the railroad back in operation within four days. He admitted that the largest bridge would not be repaired for two weeks, but that he would make a river steamer available to transfer freight across the Holston. Confederate States Secretary of War James Seddon wondered if Buckner's repair estimates were too optimistic. Burnside's sources informed him that the Strawberry Plains bridge would take two months to rebuild. Sanders was promoted brigadier general on October 18, 1863, and mortally wounded in action on November 18, 1863, at Knoxville.

Locations of interest
Childress Gap
Haworth Bend
Powder Spring Gap
Rogers Gap

Notes
Footnotes

Citations

References

Conflicts in 1863
1863 in Tennessee
Knoxville campaign
Battles of the Western Theater of the American Civil War
Union victories of the American Civil War
Battles of the American Civil War in Tennessee
June 1863 events
Cavalry raids of the American Civil War